Tavil (also Romanized as Ţavīl, Tāvīl, Tāwil, Ţovayel, and Ţoveyyel) is a village in Soveyseh Rural District, in the Soveyseh District of Karun County, Khuzestan Province, Iran. At the 2006 census, its population was 125, in 20 families.

References 

Populated places in Karun County